Kennetcook is a community in the Canadian province of Nova Scotia, located in the Municipal District of East Hants.  Also see adjacent community of Upper Kennetcook.

History 
The village takes its name from the Kennetcook River which is believed to come from a Mi'kmaq word meaning "The Place Further Ahead or The Place Nearby". The river was an important east-west canoe and portage route for the Mi'kmaq people connecting the Piziquid (Windsor) area with the canoe routes and settlement areas along the Shubenacadie River. A trail from Halifax to the Acadian settlements at Noel on the Minas Basin crossed the Kennetcook River at a ford near the site of the village, making it an early crossroads.

After the American Revolution, the village was part of the Douglas Township, which was named after Sir Charles Douglas, 1st Baronet. The village was settled by the troops of the 84th Regiment of Foot (Royal Highland Emigrants) for their service in the war, protecting Nova Scotia from ongoing American Patriot attacks by land and sea.

Joseph Salter, the noted shipbuilder and first mayor of Moncton, New Brunswick, was born in Kennetcook in 1816.

In 1901, the Midland Railway was built through the village enhancing the crossroads as a retail and service centre for the area. Kennetcook grew to host a hotel by the station, a bank and several stores. The Midland was acquired by the Dominion Atlantic Railway in 1905 and later by the Canadian Pacific which added further rail traffic as well as shipping farm products and lumber from Kennetcook through connections to Windsor and Truro. Highway construction after World War Two undermine railway traffic leading to the end of passenger and regular freight service in 1979 and removal of the railway in 1983.

Bridges and transportation 

A covered bridge spanned the Kennetcook River until 1967. This was the last covered bridge in Nova Scotia.

Currently, efforts are underway to revitalize the downtown through development and implementation of an economic development plan. This development plan will include the construction of an amphitheatre, multi-purpose center, commercial development space and the re-construction of the covered bridge.
Kennetcook was also known for its Douglas Township celebration every year.

Literary connections
The "Father of Canadian Poetry" Sir Charles G.D. Roberts wrote a fictional story that was set just before the Expulsion of the Acadians (1755).  The story is an account of a Mi'kmaq raid on British settlers in Kennetcook entitled "Raid on Kennetcook" (alternatively titled "Raid from Beauséjour"). Roberts wrote the story in 1894 while he worked at University of King's College, which was then located in Windsor, Nova Scotia.

In 1953, the noted Canadian poet Alden Nowlan graduated from the Folk School located in the Kennetcook Hotel (present-day Law Office).

Notable residents 
 Robert Paterson, gardener for William D. Lawrence, Maitland
 Captain Joel Scott, brother of the Mariner of Minasville Captain William Scott

References

External links
 Kennetcook Society of Economic & Environmental Development
"Kennetcook - History", Municipality of East Hants

Communities in Hants County, Nova Scotia
General Service Areas in Nova Scotia